Vadims Voinovs (born 3 April 1965) is a Latvian judoka. He competed in the men's half-heavyweight event at the 1992 Summer Olympics.

References

1965 births
Living people
Latvian male judoka
Olympic judoka of Latvia
Judoka at the 1992 Summer Olympics
Sportspeople from Riga